SS Gouverneur Morris (Hull Number 1627) was a Liberty ship built in the United States during World War II.  She was named after Gouverneur Morris, a Founding Father who wrote large sections of the United States Constitution, including its Preamble.

The ship was laid down on 29 March 1943, then launched on 18 April 1943.  She was given to the Soviet Union in 1943, where she was renamed the Leningrad.  Later in her life, she was given the name Ivan Kulibin after an 18th-century Russian mechanic and inventor before the ship was scrapped in 1974.

References

Liberty ships
Ships built in Portland, Oregon
1943 ships
Ships named for Founding Fathers of the United States